Surya Bahadur KC was a Nepali industrialist and a House of Representatives member. He was known for founding Rara Noodle in Nepal. He was a part of Nepali Congress since three years before he died. He also held the post of central treasurer at Rastriya Prajatantra Party. Surya Bahadur KC had also won elections for the chief of Pokhara city when the Panchayat Era was there.

References 

1957 births
2020 deaths
Nepalese politicians
20th-century Nepalese businesspeople
Place of birth missing
Place of death missing
Nepal MPs 2017–2022
Rastriya Prajatantra Party Nepal politicians
People from Pokhara
Nepalese company founders
Members of the 1st Nepalese Constituent Assembly
Nepali Congress politicians from Gandaki Province